Mossie may refer to:

People
 Mossie Carroll (born 1957), Irish former hurler
 Mossie Dowling (born 1946), Irish former hurler
 Maurice Enright (died 1920), Irish-American gangster
 Maurice Mossie Finn (1931-2009), Irish hurler
 Mossie Guttormsen (1916–1998), Australian cricketer
 Mossie Lyons, Irish Gaelic football half-back
 Mossie Smith, British actress
 Mossie Walsh, Irish former hurler

Other uses
 Nickname of the De Havilland Mosquito, a Royal Air Force Second World War aircraft
 Cape sparrow, a bird
 The Mossie, a rap group

See also
 Mossy (disambiguation)
 Mossi (disambiguation)
 Mozzie (disambiguation)

Lists of people by nickname